Seamus McCallion is an Irish former professional rugby league footballer who played in the 1980s and 1990s.

Playing career

International honours
Seamus McCallion won caps for Ireland while Unattached, and at Bramley in 1995 and 1996 gaining 3-caps.

Championship appearances
Seamus McCallion played in all 37-matches in Halifax's victory in the Championship during the 1985–86 season, scoring 7-tries in 30 League matches and 2 in Cup competitions.

Challenge Cup Final appearances
Seamus McCallion played , and scored a try in Halifax's 19-18 victory over St. Helens in the 1987 Challenge Cup Final during the 1986–87 season at Wembley Stadium, London on Saturday 2 May 1987, and played  in the 12-32 defeat by Wigan in the 1988 Challenge Cup Final during the 1987–88 season at Wembley Stadium, London on Saturday 30 April 1988.

Regal Trophy Final appearances
Seamus McCallion played   in Halifax' 12-24 defeat by Wigan in the 1989–90 Regal Trophy Final during the 1989–90 season at Headingley, Leeds on Saturday 13 January 1990.

Honoured by Rugby League Ireland
On 25 March 2004 six footballers were inducted into Rugby League Ireland's inaugural Hall of Fame at the Rugby League Heritage Centre in Huddersfield, they were; John "Jack" Daly (Huddersfield/Featherstone Rovers), Robert "Bob" Kelly (Keighley/Wakefield Trinity/Batley), Seamus McCallion (Halifax/Leeds/Bramley), Thomas "Tom" McKinney, (Salford/Warrington/St. Helens), Terry O'Connor (Salford/Wigan Warriors/Widnes Vikings), Patrick "Paddy" Reid (Huddersfield/Halifax).

References

External links
(archived by web.archive.org) Crooks in trouble

1964 births
Living people
Bramley RLFC players
Expatriate rugby league players in England
Halifax R.L.F.C. players
Ireland national rugby league team players
Irish expatriate rugby league players
Irish expatriate sportspeople in England
Irish rugby league coaches
Irish rugby league players
Leeds Rhinos players
Lindley Swifts players
Newcastle Thunder coaches
Rugby league hookers
Rugby league players from County Antrim